Hemicoelus gibbicollis, known generally as California deathwatch beetle, is a species of death-watch beetle in the family Ptinidae. Other common names include the Pacific powder post beetle and western deathwatch beetle. It is found in North America.

References

Further reading

 
 
 

Anobiinae
Articles created by Qbugbot
Beetles described in 1859